Seventh-seeded sisters Katerina Maleeva and Manuela Maleeva claimed the title by defeating third-seeds Penny Barg and Paula Smith in the final.

Seeds
A champion seed is indicated in bold text while text in italics indicates the round in which that seed was eliminated.

Draw

Finals

Top half

Bottom half

External links

U.S. Clay Court Championships
1985 U.S. Clay Court Championships